Dönük Qırıqlı (also, Dënyuk Kyrykly and Denyuk-Kurukhly) is a village and municipality in the Tovuz Rayon of Azerbaijan.  It has a population of 3,577.

References 

Populated places in Tovuz District